Mats Karlsson (born 20 January 1963) is a Swedish volleyball player. He competed in the men's tournament at the 1988 Summer Olympics.

References

External links
 

1963 births
Living people
Swedish men's volleyball players
Olympic volleyball players of Sweden
Volleyball players at the 1988 Summer Olympics
People from Nyköping Municipality
Sportspeople from Södermanland County